The 1987 British Speedway Championship was the 27th edition of the British Speedway Championship. The Final took place on 31 May at Brandon in Coventry, England. The Championship was won by Kelvin Tatum, with 1986 champion Neil Evitts in second place and Simon Wigg in third.

Final 
31 May 1987
 Brandon Stadium, Coventry

See also 
 British Speedway Championship
 1987 Individual Speedway World Championship

References 

British Speedway Championship
Great Britain